The Old Eddyville Historic District, located off KY 730 in Eddyville, Kentucky, is an  historic district which was listed on the National Register of Historic Places in 1981.  It included 13 contributing buildings.

It includes the surviving portion of the original town of Eddyville , "one of western Kentucky's earliest and most important settlements", after the majority of the town was flooded by the 1966 damming (flooding) of the Cumberland River at Barkley Dam.  It includes the Kentucky State Penitentiary and nine historic buildings at its base.

References

Historic districts on the National Register of Historic Places in Kentucky
Greek Revival architecture in Kentucky
Romanesque Revival architecture in Kentucky
Government buildings completed in 1889
National Register of Historic Places in Lyon County, Kentucky
Prisons on the National Register of Historic Places